The lynching of Fred Alexander was committed by a mob in Leavenworth, Kansas on January 15, 1901, after he was arrested for rape and murder. He was killed when he was burned alive while tied to a metal rail. The Democratic Party-allied newspaper had been fomenting fear of African Americans as libidinous sexual predators. Results of official investigations disputed whether there was a rape and only circumstantial evidence was used to blame him for the alleged crime. The lynching and its aftermath were widely covered in newspapers.

Alexander was a veteran of the Spanish–American War. He was accused of the rape and murder of 19-year-old Pearl Forbes. He was castrated during the lynching.

See also
 False accusations of rape as justification for lynchings

References

1901 deaths
1901 murders in the United States
Castrated people
Deaths by person in Kansas
January 1901 events
Murdered African-American people
1901 in Kansas
People murdered in Kansas
People charged with rape
Racially motivated violence against African Americans
People charged with murder
Leavenworth, Kansas